Thomas Overton Moore (April 10, 1804 – June 25, 1876) was an attorney and politician who was the 16th Governor of Louisiana from 1860 until 1864 during the American Civil War. Anticipating that Louisiana's Ordinance of Secession would be passed in January 1861, he ordered the state militia to seize all U.S. military posts.

Early years
Moore was born in Sampson County, North Carolina, one of eleven children of James Moore and Jane Overton. The Moores were a Carolina planter family, and Jane Overton was the daughter of General Thomas Overton, a Tennessean and friend of Andrew Jackson. In 1829, Moore moved to Rapides Parish, Louisiana, to become a cotton planter. The next year, he married Bethiah Johnston Leonard, with whom he had five children.

Originally the manager of his uncle's plantation, he bought his own (Moreland), along with two others (Lodi and Emfield) and became highly prosperous. He was elected to the State House of Representatives in 1848, and the State Senate in 1856. In the Senate, Moore was chairman of the Education Committee and led the effort to establish the Louisiana State Seminary, now known as Louisiana State University and Agricultural and Mechanical College. Moore played a role in the selection of William Tecumseh Sherman as the first Superintendent of the La. State Seminary.

Governor of Louisiana
He was elected  Democratic governor in November 1859, defeating Thomas Jefferson Wells, and shortly thereafter had the occasion to meet W.T. Sherman, superintendent of the newly created Louisiana Military Academy in Pineville, the forerunner of Louisiana State University in Baton Rouge. He took the oath of office on January 23, 1860. In his inaugural address, Moore told the legislators and visitors at the Capitol that a powerful party in the North threatened the existence of the slave-holding states:

So bitter is this hostility felt toward slavery, which these fifteen states regard as a great social and political blessing, that it exhibits itself in legislation for the avowed purpose of destroying the rights of slaveholders guaranteed by the Constitution and protected by the Acts of Congress. . . . [in] the North, a widespread sympathy with felons has deepened the distrust in the permanent Federal Government, and awakened sentiments favorable to a separation of states.

A supporter of John C. Breckinridge in the 1860 election, the winner of the Louisiana electoral votes, he ordered U.S. military posts in the state to be seized by state militia on January 10, 1861, as the state convention on secession was sitting. The ordinance of secession passed the convention on January 26, 1861. Moore placed Col. Braxton Bragg in command of the state military, and Louisiana joined the Confederate States of America on March 21, 1861, the sixth state to do so.

Despite Moore's appeals to the Confederate government for a strong defense of New Orleans, and brisk recruiting of troops in Louisiana, the state rapidly came under threat during the Civil War. The Union blockade disrupted commerce in New Orleans, and the naval forces assembling in the Gulf would advance up the Mississippi in early 1862. After a prolonged bombardment, the Battle of Forts Jackson and St. Philip concluded with the destruction of the Confederate navy on the lower Mississippi and the passage of the forts by the Union fleet in the early morning of April 24, 1862. New Orleans surrendered on April 27. Two days earlier, Moore and the legislature had decided to abandon Baton Rouge as the state capital, relocating to Opelousas on May 1, 1862.

Moore visited the state militia at the eponymous Camp Moore in Tangipahoa Parish and began organizing military resistance at the state level, ordering the burning of cotton, cessation of trade with the Union forces, and calling for the enlistment of all free white males between ages 17 and 50 in the militia.

In May 1861, shortly after the onset of the civil war, 1500 free black New Orleanians formed the 1st Louisiana Native Guard (CSA) as a response to Governor Moore's call for troops. It was the first military unit in American history to have black officers. However, despite a brief check at Baton Rouge, Union forces continued to advance into Louisiana and up the Mississippi, and the capital was moved again to Shreveport.

After the governorship
In January 1864, Moore's term as governor ended, and he was succeeded by Henry Watkins Allen. He returned to his plantation, but was soon forced to flee upriver by the Red River Campaign, soldiers of which burned the plantation in May. After the Civil War, he fled into Mexico to escape arrest, and subsequently to Havana. From Havana, Moore applied for a pardon. Moore's application for pardon was delivered by hand to Andrew Johnson by William Tecumseh Sherman. He eventually returned to Louisiana after being pardoned by Andrew Johnson on January 15, 1867. His lands were restored to him, in part through the influence of Sherman, and he left politics, spending the rest of his life rebuilding his livelihood.  He died in 1876 near Alexandria, Louisiana.

Moore's Civil War-era residence from 1862 through 1863 — the oldest Louisiana governor's mansion still in existence at the time — was destroyed by an intentionally set fire on July 14, 2016.

See also
CSS Governor Moore, a Confederate "cotton-clad" warship named after him.

References

External links
Shermans' Memoirs
Louisiana Timeline
State of Louisiana - Biography
Cemetery Memorial by La-Cemeteries

Democratic Party members of the Louisiana House of Representatives
1804 births
1876 deaths
People of Louisiana in the American Civil War
People of North Carolina in the American Civil War
American Presbyterians
American planters
Democratic Party governors of Louisiana
Confederate States of America state governors
19th-century American politicians